Callyna semivitta is a moth of the family Noctuidae first described by Frederic Moore in 1882. It is found in India, Taiwan, Vietnam and Malaysia.

References

Amphipyrinae
Moths of Asia